The infraspinous fossa (infraspinatus fossa or infraspinatous fossa) of the scapula is much larger than the supraspinatous fossa; toward its vertebral margin a shallow concavity is seen at its upper part; its center presents a prominent convexity, while near the axillary border is a deep groove which runs from the upper toward the lower part.

The medial two-thirds of the fossa give origin to the Infraspinatus; the lateral third is covered by this muscle.

Additional images

References

External links

 

Shoulder
Scapula